The 1967 Palestinian exodus refers to the flight of around 280,000 to 325,000 Palestinians out of the territories captured by Israel during and in the aftermath of the Six-Day War, including the demolition of the Palestinian villages of Imwas, Yalo, and Bayt Nuba, Surit, Beit Awwa, Beit Mirsem, Shuyukh, Al-Jiftlik, Agarith and Huseirat and the "emptying" of the refugee camps of Aqabat Jaber and ʿEin as-Sultan. Approximately 145,000 of the 1967 Palestinian refugees were refugees from the 1948 Palestine War. By December 1967, 245,000 had fled from the West Bank and Gaza Strip further into Jordan, 11,000 had fled from the Gaza Strip further into Egypt and 116,000 Palestinians and Syrians had fled from the Golan Heights further into Syria.

A United Nations Special Committee heard allegations of the destruction of over 400 Arab villages, but no evidence in corroboration was furnished to the Special Committee to investigate Israeli practices affecting the human rights of the population of the occupied territories.

Until 1967, roughly half of all Palestinians still lived within the boundaries of former Mandatory Palestine, but the majority lived outside the territory from 1967.

A 1971 United Nations report stated that: "On the basis of the testimony placed before it or obtained by it in the course of its investigations, the Special Committee had been led to conclude that the Government of Israel is deliberately carrying out policies aimed at preventing the population of the occupied territories from returning to their homes and forcing those who are in their homes in the occupied territories to leave, either by direct means such as deportation or indirectly by attempts at undermining their morale or through the offer of special inducements, all with the ultimate object of annexing and settling the occupied territories. The Special Committee considers the acts of the Government of Israel in furtherance of these policies to be the most serious violation of human rights that has come to its attention. The evidence shows that this situation has deteriorated since the last mission of the Special Committee in 1970." 

After the psychological warfare unit made a visit to Qalqilya and many of the residents had fled, the UN representative Nils-Göran Gussing noted that 850 of the town's 2,000 houses were demolished.

See also
 1948 Palestinian exodus
 1949–56 Palestinian exodus
 Palestinian exodus from Kuwait (Gulf War)
 Palestinian diaspora
 Jewish exodus from Arab and Muslim countries

Notes

References
Bowker, Robert P. G. (2003). Palestinian Refugees: Mythology, Identity, and the Search for Peace. Lynne Rienner Publishers. 
Gerson, Allan (1978). Israel, the West Bank and International Law. Routledge. 
McDowall, David (1989). Palestine and Israel: The Uprising and Beyond. I.B.Tauris. .
Segev, Tom (2007) 1967 Israel, The War and the Year that Transformed the Middle East Little Brown 

History of the Palestinian refugees
Forced migration